The Norton Dam (also sometimes called the Norton Bridge Dam) is the gravity dam built across the Kehelgamu Oya, which is a main tributary to the Kelani River. The dam is built at Norton Bridge, in the Central Province of Sri Lanka.

Reservoir and power station 
The dam creates the relatively small Norton Reservoir, which is sustained by water from the Kehelgamu Oya, and water discharged from the Wimalasurendra Hydroelectric Power Station, which is located at the upstream side of the reservoir. The Wimalasurendra Power Station or the Norton Bridge Power station is fed from the reservoir at Castles Reigh about 2000 feet above the Norton Reservoir.

See also 

 List of dams and reservoirs in Sri Lanka
 List of power stations in Sri Lanka

References 

1950 establishments in Ceylon
Buildings and structures in Nuwara Eliya District
Dams completed in 1950
Dams in Sri Lanka
Gravity dams
Hydroelectric power stations in Sri Lanka